A special election was held in  on October 5, 1812 to fill a vacancy left by the resignation of Howell Cobb (DR) to accept a commission as an army captain in the War of 1812 earlier that year.

Election results

Barnett took his seat November 27, 1812

See also
List of special elections to the United States House of Representatives

References

Georgia 1812 At-large
Georgia 1812 At-large
1812 At-large
Georgia At-large
1812 Georgia (U.S. state) elections
United States House of Representatives 1812 at-large